Larkinella rosea is a bacterium from the genus of Larkinella which has been isolated from beach soil.

References 

Cytophagia
Bacteria described in 2018